Napasar railway station is a railway station in Bikaner district, Rajasthan. Its code is NPS. It serves Napasar town. The station consists of 2 platforms. Passenger, Express, and Superfast trains halt here.

Trains

The following trains halt at Napasar railway station in both directions:

 Bikaner–Delhi Sarai Rohilla Superfast Express
 Howrah–Jaisalmer Superfast Express
 Bikaner–Delhi Sarai Rohilla Intercity Express

References

Railway stations in Bikaner district
Bikaner railway division